Omar Segura (born 24 April 1981) is a Mexican racewalker. He competed in the men's 20 kilometres walk at the 2004 Summer Olympics.

References

1981 births
Living people
Athletes (track and field) at the 2004 Summer Olympics
Mexican male racewalkers
Olympic athletes of Mexico
Place of birth missing (living people)
21st-century Mexican people